The Roman Catholic Archdiocese of Sorocaba is an archdiocese located in the city of Sorocaba in Brazil.

History
 4 July 1924: Established as Diocese of Sorocaba from the Diocese of Botucatu, Metropolitan Archdiocese of São Paulo and Diocese of Taubaté
 29 April 1992: Promoted as Metropolitan Archdiocese of Sorocaba

Bishops

Ordinaries, in reverse chronological order
 Archbishops of Sorocaba (Roman rite), below
 Archbishop Júlio Endi Akamine, S.A.C. (2016.12.28 - present)
 Archbishop Eduardo Benes de Sales Rodrigues (2005.05.04 – 2016.12.28)
 Archbishop José Lambert Filho, C.S.S.  (1992.04.29 – 2005.05.04)
 Bishops of Sorocaba (Roman Rite), below
 Bishop José Lambert Filho, C.S.S. (later Archbishop) (1981.03.20 – 1992.04.29)
 Bishop José Melhado Campos (1973.01.08 – 1981.03.20)
 Bishop José Carlos de Aguirre (1924.07.04 – 1973.01.08)

Coadjutor bishops
José Thurler (1962-1965), did not succeed to see; resigned; appointed Auxiliary Bishop of São Paulo in 1966
José Melhado Campos (1965-1973)
José Lambert Filho, C.S.S. (1979-1981)

Auxiliary bishops
Almir Marques Ferreira (1957-1961), appointed Bishop of Uberlândia, Minas Gerais
Amaury Castanho (1976-1979), appointed Bishop of Valença, Rio de Janeiro

Other priests of this diocese who became bishops
Antônio Maria Mucciolo, appointed Bishop of Barretos, São Paulo in 1977
José Benedito Cardoso (priest here, 1986-1998), appointed Auxiliary Bishop of São Paulo in 2019

Suffragan dioceses
 Diocese of Itapetininga 
 Diocese of Itapeva
 Diocese of Jundiaí
 Diocese of Registro

Sources
 GCatholic.org
 Catholic Hierarchy
  Archdiocese website (Portuguese)

Roman Catholic dioceses in Brazil
Roman Catholic ecclesiastical provinces in Brazil
 
Christian organizations established in 1924
Roman Catholic dioceses and prelatures established in the 20th century